Wiener Blut is the 1988 fifth album by Falco. It was dedicated to Falco's daughter, Bianca, recorded in 1987 and produced by Bolland & Bolland. This album was much less successful than Emotional, but in Austria, Germany and Switzerland, it peaked Top 3 and Top 20 in the charts. In 2022, it was remastered and re-issued in a deluxe CD and coloured vinyl format - including, for the first time, many extended mixes of songs and single edits.

Track listing

Original Album 
 "Wiener Blut" [Viennese Blood] – 3:31
 "Falco Rides Again" – 4:45
 "Untouchable" – 3:18
 "Tricks" – 3:55
 "Garbo" – 3:52
 "Satellite to Satellite" – 5:16
 "Read a Book" – 3:57
 "Walls of Silence" – 4:41
 "Solid Booze" – 4:33
 "Sand Am Himalaya" – 4:01
 "Do It Again" – 5:15

2022 Remaster 
 12. Wiener Blut (12" Remix) - 7:20
 13. Satellite to Satellite (Extended Remix Version) - 8:19
 14. Do It Again (Shep Pettibone 12" Remix) - 8:57

2022 Remaster Bonus Disc 
 Body Next to Body (Dance Mix) - 6:18
 Body Next to Body (Extended Rock Version) - 6:30
 Body Next to Body (Extended Other Version) - 6:22
 Body Next to Body (Rock Version) - 4:20
 Body Next to Body (Other Version) - 4:16
 Body Next to Body (Radio Version) - 4:20
 Satellite to Satellite (TV-Mix) - 3:26
 Satellite to Satellite (Special Radio Edit) - 3:26
 Satellite to Satellite (Full Length Special Radio Edit) - 4:09
 Satellite to Satellite (Instrumental Version) - 4:24
 Do It Again (Shep Pettibone 7" Remix/Edit) - 4:20
 Do It Again (Shep Pettibone Dub It Again Mix) - 7:53

The title track was taken from the Falco 3 sessions.

References 

1988 albums
Falco (musician) albums
Sire Records albums
German-language albums